Big Monday is a presentation of Division I college basketball on ESPN.

History
Since debuting on January 5, 1987, it has broadcast games from numerous conferences, including: the Big East, which had been a Big Monday staple from 1987 until 2013; the Big Ten (1987–1991); the Big Eight (1992–1996); the Big 12 (1997–present); and either the Mountain West or the WAC.

Originally, the Big Ten Conference games were aired in the 9 pm slot, before the Big 8/Big 12 games joined Big Monday in 1992. However, the Big 10 didn't like to start games at 9 pm ET and declined to renew their agreement with ESPN. The Big 8/12 was glad to oblige, though; ESPN commentator Ron Franklin called that decision "the single best thing that ever happened to Big 12 basketball," since it gave the new conference a weekly national showcase that solidified it as one of the best basketball conferences in the country. Big Monday was the first weekly presentation of college basketball on ESPN. Since then ESPN has debuted Super Tuesday, ACC Wednesday (now Wednesday Night Hoops), Throwdown Thursday (now Thursday Night Showcase) and Saturday Primetime.

Early in its existence, the Big West was the nightcap, often featuring powerhouse UNLV teams of the late 1980s/early 1990s. All three conferences had 'BIG' in it.

In 2008, Big Monday featured a triple-header. On ESPN a Big East game would air at 7 pm ET followed by a Big 12 game at 9 pm ET. The third game would feature WCC teams, usually on ESPN2 at 11 pm ET.

Following the restructuring of the Big East that a reformed Big East Conference sign a contract with Fox Sports 1, ESPN opted to move the Atlantic Coast Conference to the early time slot for the 2013-14 season.

The ACC game is primarily at 7 pm ET and the Big 12 game is primarily at 9 pm ET, both on ESPN. The Mountain West or WAC game is almost always on ESPN2 at 10 pm ET or later.

Personalities

Current
Kris Budden: (sideline reporter, 2020–present) ACC
Sean McDonough: (play-by-play, 2002–present) ACC
Fran Fraschilla: (analyst, 2004–present) Big 12
Holly Rowe: (sideline reporter, 2006–present) Big 12
Seth Greenberg: (analyst, 2012–present) College GameNight
Bob Wischusen: (play-by-play, 2016–present) Big 12
Jay Bilas: (analyst, 2003–2014, 2016–present) ACC
Doris Burke (analyst, 2015–present) ACC
Dick Vitale: (analyst, 2016–present) ACC- select weeks

Former
Mike Gorman: (play-by-play, 1987–1991) Big East
Gary Thorne: (play-by-play, 1992–?) Big East
Bob Carpenter: (play by play, ?–2004) Mountain West
Hubert Davis: (analyst, 2006) Mountain West or WAC
Jimmy Dykes: (analyst, 2005) Mountain West or WAC
Len Elmore: (analyst, 2006) College GameNight
Ron Franklin: (play-by-play, 2005–2010) Big 12
Mike Jarvis: (analyst, 2005) College GameNight
Dave Pasch: (play-by-play, 2005–2006) Mountain West or WAC
Dave Revsine: (host, 2005–2007) College GameNight (now on the Big Ten Network)
Jon Sundvold: (analyst, ?–2004) Big 12
Stacey Dales: (analyst 2007–2008) College GameNight
Terry Gannon: (play by play, 2006-2009) Mountain West, WAC or WCC
Stephen Bardo: (analyst, 2006-2009) Mountain West, WAC or WCC
Bob Knight: (analyst, 2010-2012) Big 12
Bill Raftery: (analyst, 1987–2013) Big East
Shane Battier: (analyst, 2015) ACC
Brent Musburger: (play by play, 2010–2016) Big 12
Allison Williams: (sideline reporter, 2014–2021) ACC

See also
College GameDay
Super Tuesday
Wednesday Night Hoops
Thursday Night Showcase
Saturday Primetime
ESPN College Basketball Broadcast Teams

References

Press Release: ABC SPORTS, ESPN, ESPN2 AND ESPNU MEN'S COLLEGE BASKETBALL TELECASTS TO FEATURE NEW AND RETURNING COMMENTATORS

External links
ESPN.tv basketball
ESPN Men's College Basketball TV schedule

1987 American television series debuts
ESPN original programming
ESPN2 original programming
College basketball on television in the United States
Sports telecast series
ESPN College Basketball